Oxford United Football Club is an English association football club originally formed in 1893 under the name Headington United. The club played in local Oxfordshire leagues until being elected into the Southern League in 1949. It was at this time the club turned professional. The club adopted its present name in 1960 and was elected into the Football League in 1962, replacing Accrington Stanley. Promotion to the Third Division followed in 1965, and the club were promoted again 3 years later and enjoyed an eight-year spell in the Football League Second Division, before being relegated. "The U's" reached the top tier of English football in 1985 after successive promotions, where they stayed for 3 years. During this time United won their only piece of major silverware, the 1986 Football League Cup.

Apart from relegation to the redesignated Second Division (the old Third Division after the creation of the Premier League) and subsequent promotion shortly afterwards, Oxford United remained in the second tier for eleven years until 1999. After this a decline set in, with two relegations in three years to the Football League Third Division, the fourth tier of English football. In 2006 Oxford became the first club to have reached the First Division and won a major trophy to be relegated from the Football League. One of the teams to be promoted were Conference champions Accrington Stanley, 44 years after Accrington lost their league status to Oxford. United gained promotion back to the Football League after beating York City 3–1 in the 2010 Conference Premier play-off Final. After six seasons in League Two they finished 2nd in the table and were promoted to League One, the third tier of the English football pyramid.

Seasons

Key
Division shown in bold when it changes because of promotion, relegation or league reorganisation.  Top scorer shown in bold when he set or equalled a club record.

Key to league record:
P = Played
W = Games won
D = Games drawn
L = Games lost
F = Goals for
A = Goals against
Pts = Points
Pos = Final position

Key to divisions:
Div 1 = Football League First Division
Div 2 = Football League Second Division
Div 3 = Football League Third Division
Div 4 = Football League Fourth Division
Lge 2 = Football League Two
Conf Nat = Conference National
OCJ = Oxfordshire City Junior A Division
ODL = Oxfordshire District League
OSC = Oxfordshire Senior Cup
Oxon = Oxfordshire Senior Football League
SLP = Southern Football League Premier
SP1W = Spartan League Division 1 (Western)
AIC = Anglo-Italian Cup
AMC = Associate Members Cup
CLC = Conference League Cup
FAT = FA Trophy
FLGC = Football League Group Cup
FLT = Football League Trophy
FMC = Full Members Cup
SLC = Southern League Cup

Key to rounds:
Expre = Extra Preliminary round
Prelim = Preliminary round
Q1 = Qualifying Round 1
Q2 = Qualifying Round 2
Q3 = Qualifying Round 3
Q4 = Qualifying Round 4
R1 = Round 1
R2 = Round 2
R3 = Round 3
R4 = Round 4
R5 = Round 5

R6 = Round 6
Grp = Group stage
AQF = Area Quarter-finals
QF = Quarter-finals
ASF = Area Semi-finals
SF = Semi-finals
F = Southern Final
Final = Runners-Up
W = Winners

Notes
A.  The Football League Cup competition did not start until the 1960–61 season.
B.  There are no complete records of scorers until 1898 
C.  Includes goals scored in the Oxon League, City Junior League, Oxfordshire District League, the Football League (including play-offs), FA Cup, Anglo-Italian Cup, Football League Cup, Associate Members' Cup/Football League Trophy, Conference National (including playoffs), FA Trophy and Conference League Cup.
D.  The FA Cup was not held until 1945 because of World War 2.
E.  The league records are incomplete.
G.  Headington left the Oxfordshire Senior League and moved into the Spartan League.
H.  Headington United were elected into the Southern League.
I.  Headington United were disqualified following an appeal from Wycombe Wanderers.
J.  Despite finishing as champions, Oxford United failed to be elected into the Football League.
K.  Oxford United were elected into the football league, replacing the original Accrington Stanley.
L.  From the 1981–82 season, points were allocated on the basis of 3 for a win and 1 for a draw; previously only two points had been given for a win.
M.  The Football League Group Cup was renamed Football League Trophy for the 1982–83 season. The current tournament of the same name was originally the Associate Members Cup.
N.  Oxford United reached the Southern Final round, but failed to reach the overall final.
O.  Division Two re-designated Division One on formation of the F.A. Premier League.
P.  Football League Division Three renamed "League Two" because of a sponsorship change.
Q.  After qualifying for the play-offs, Oxford United lost on penalties in the semi-finals against Exeter City.
AA.  Only one match was played before the competition was scrapped and replaced with a Junior Cup.
AB.  A match against St Paul's was a walkover.
AC.  No table was kept as a way of ordering the teams.
AD.  A match against Cowley Juniors was a walkover.
AE.  Oxford United went on to the league final, winning it in consecutive seasons.
AF.  Oxford's application to join the second division of the Oxfordshire District League was accepted.
AG.  Because of the Boer War, Oxford were forced to withdraw from the Oxfordshire District League as 10 members of the team were on active duty. However, the following season they returned to the league.
AH.   A match against College Servants was a walkover.
AI.  Oxford were deducted 2 points for fielding an illegible player.
AJ.  After crowd trouble during a game against Victoria, Oxford were banned from playing matches within three miles of their ground, and such could not fulfill their league fixtures.
AK.  Only 44 games were played because of the expulsion of Chester City halfway through the season.
AL.  Oxford were promoted through the play-offs, beating York City 3–1 at Wembley Stadium.
AM.  The League one season was suspended on 3 March 2020 because of the COVID-19 pandemic, with clubs voting to curtail the season three months later. Positions were decided based on points per game (PPG).

References
General

 
 

Specific

English football club seasons
 
Seasons
Oxford-related lists